Zhloba (Cyrillic: Жлоба) is an East Slavic surname. Notable people with the surname include:

 Dmitry Zhloba (1887–1938), Soviet military commander
 Nikita Zhloba (born 1995), Russian ice hockey player

See also
 

East Slavic-language surnames